Yellowjacket is the name of several fictional characters appearing in American comic books published by Marvel Comics.

Corey Stoll portrays an original incarnation of the character, Darren Cross, in the Marvel Cinematic Universe (MCU) film Ant-Man (2015), with the comic version of the character subsequently assuming the mantle, while Michael Douglas voices the Hank Pym incarnation of the character in the MCU television series What If...? (2021).

Fictional character biography

Hank Pym

Dr. Henry "Hank" Pym, who has had several other superhero identies, including Ant-Man, Giant-Man and Goliath, is the first character to take on the Yellowjacket codename. The character has been associated with several superhero teams in the Marvel Universe, including the Avengers and the Defenders.

Rita DeMara

Rita DeMara is a fictional character appearing in American comic books published by Marvel Comics. The second Yellowjacket, she is initially a reluctant supervillainess and later superheroine.

Publication history
Yellowjacket first appeared in The Avengers #264 (February 1986), and was created by Roger Stern and John Buscema.

Years later, she was featured as a regular character in the Guardians of the Galaxy and Avengers titles. Guardians of the Galaxy writer/artist Jim Valentino reminisced, "It was my group's first foray into the 20th Century. I knew they were going to meet the Masters of Evil... She was a member of the Masters of Evil at the time and I liked her. I thought it would be nice to have someone see the 31st Century through present-day eyes. It would give a new perspective, so I asked if I could have her. They said yes, and even though I never got the chance to write her in, they put her in the group after I was gone."

Yellowjacket was one of the feature characters in the 2011 three-issue limited series Chaos War: Dead Avengers.

Fictional character biography

Criminal career
When first seen, Rita DeMara was a reluctant supervillainess who had stolen one of Hank Pym's Yellowjacket costumes, and modified it, making it more feminine (and removing the insect emblem). However, when she clashed with the Wasp, she became terrified upon shrinking, and was captured.

Yellowjacket participates in a takeover of the Avengers Mansion, assisting one of the more powerful versions of the Masters of Evil as a professional criminal. Defeated, Yellowjacket is sent to prison but is freed by the Fixer with amorous intentions. She flees and tries to gain revenge on the Wasp, but is distracted by the sight of Black Knight. Furious at being rejected, the Fixer tries to kill her. Black Knight helps Yellowjacket defeat him and the two part on possibly romantic terms.

During a time when no Avengers were active, her costume receives a call for help from an automated system at an old Avengers base. She finds herself teaming up with the Beast, The Captain, Falcon, Hercules, the Hulk and Jocasta. They battle the High Evolutionary wishing to jumpstart humanity's evolution through worldwide catastrophe. Yellowjacket helps battle through the Evolutionary's underground submarine base, fighting against dozens of his soldiers. Eventually the Evolutionary is defeated by Hercules, the two evolving out of reality. She later briefly serves as a member of Superia's Femizons.

Her second affiliation with the Masters of Evil begins and ends during the Infinity War. Her team, led by Doctor Octopus, confronts the Guardians of the Galaxy inside the Avengers Mansion as the Masters had wished to take it over. Yellowjacket is soon betrayed by her side. Moments later, both teams are overwhelmed by waves of evil aliens. These aliens were impersonating all the super-powered beings involved. Each double wishes to take over the relevant body. Despite many aliens being slain, more show up.

The Guardians and the Masters both work together to stay alive. Events in the Infinity War series stop the flow of aliens. When Doctor Octopus desires to continue the fight, his men turn on him, not wanting to hurt those who had helped them. Yellowjacket is left behind and joined the Guardians.

Guardians of the Galaxy
Yellowjacket went to the 31st century with Guardians of the Galaxy. She further proves her worth when she saved the life of Charlie-27 by shrinking, flying inside his throat, and performing "surgery" on a massive blood clot with her stings. She forms a close friendship with Nikki. She later uses 31st century technology to redesign her costume, making it look less like Henry Pym's design (she even found a way to fly without installing wings on her costume).

She used her powers as a valued member of the team, until, homesick, she attempts to return to the 20th century. On the way, she stops in the near future and learns that a disaster was about to happen to the Avengers in her target time. On her return to the present, she confronts Iron Man under the control of Immortus, a powerful time-traveling being in the guise of Kang the Conqueror. Iron Man kills Yellowjacket.

Resurrection
During the Chaos War storyline, Yellowjacket is among the dead people released by Pluto to defend the Underworld from Amatsu-Mikaboshi. Because of what happened to the death realms, Yellowjacket is among the dead people that return from the dead. Yellowjacket joins with the other resurrected Avengers as they fight Grim Reaper and Nekra. Yellowjacket, along with the Swordsman, and the Shi'ar warrior Deathcry are given a second chance to live when the three of them survive Grim Reaper's attacks. After the defeat of the Chaos King, resurrected members of Alpha Flight were seen having been fully restored to life but there has been no sign of Yellowjacket.

Darren Cross

Darren Cross is the third character to use the Yellowjacket codename, after gaining the costume thanks to Egghead, and also became a supervillain.

Other versions

Ultimate Marvel
The original Ultimate Marvel incarnation of Yellowjacket is Ultron, a robot designed to be an expendable super soldier. Ultron is later killed by Hank Pym who later takes up the Yellowjacket mantle, wanting to make up for what his creation did.

In other media

Television
 The Hank Pym incarnation of Yellowjacket appears in The Avengers: Earth's Mightiest Heroes, voiced by Wally Wingert.
 The Darren Cross incarnation of Yellowjacket appears in Lego Marvel Super Heroes: Avengers Reassembled, voiced by Travis Willingham.
 The Darren Cross incarnation of Yellowjacket appears in Ant-Man (2017), voiced by William Salyers.

Marvel Cinematic Universe

 Darren Cross / Yellowjacket appears in the live-action Marvel Cinematic Universe (MCU) film Ant-Man (2015), portrayed by Corey Stoll.
 An alternate timeline version of Hank Pym / Yellowjacket appears in the Disney+ / MCU animated series What If...? episode "What If... the World Lost Its Mightiest Heroes?", voiced by Michael Douglas.

Video games
 The Hank Pym incarnation of Yellowjacket appears as a boss in Marvel: Ultimate Alliance 2, voiced by Wally Wingert.
 The MCU incarnation of Darren Cross / Yellowjacket appears in Marvel: Avengers Alliance.
 The MCU incarnation of Darren Cross / Yellowjacket appears in Marvel Contest of Champions.
 The MCU incarnation of Darren Cross / Yellowjacket appears in Marvel: Future Fight.
 The MCU incarnation of Darren Cross / Yellowjacket appears in Lego Marvel's Avengers.
 The Hank Pym incarnation of Yellowjacket appears as a playable character in Lego Marvel Super Heroes 2.
 The Hank Pym incarnation of Yellowjacket appears in Marvel Future Revolution, voiced again by Wally Wingert.
 The Darren Cross incarnation of Yellowjacket appears in Marvel Snap.

References

External links
 Marvel.com profile - Rita DeMara

Comics characters introduced in 1968
Comics characters introduced in 1986
Articles about multiple fictional characters
Fictional characters who can change size
Marvel Comics superheroes
Marvel Comics male superheroes
Marvel Comics female superheroes
Marvel Comics supervillains
Marvel Comics male supervillains
Marvel Comics female supervillains
Marvel Comics robots
Characters created by Roy Thomas
Characters created by John Buscema
Characters created by Roger Stern

pt:Jaqueta Amarela